Cofilin 2 (muscle) also known as CFL2 is a protein which in humans is encoded by the CFL2 gene.

Function
Cofilin is a widely distributed intracellular actin-modulating protein that binds and depolymerizes filamentous F-actin and inhibits the polymerization of monomeric G-actin in a pH-dependent manner. Cofilin-2 is a member of the AC group of proteins that also includes cofilin-1 (CFL1) and destrin (DSTN), all of which regulate actin-filament dynamics. The CFL2 gene encodes a skeletal muscle-specific isoform localized to the thin filaments, where it exerts its effect on actin, in part through interactions with tropomyosins.

Clinical significance
Mutations in the CFL2 gene are associated with nemaline myopathy. Deficiency of cofilin-2 may result in reduced depolymerization of actin filaments, causing their accumulation in nemaline bodies, minicores, and, possibly concentric laminated bodies.

References

External links
  GeneReviews/NCBI/NIH/UW entry on Nemaline Myopathy

Further reading